Mount Joyce is a prominent, dome-shaped mountain,  high, standing on the south side of David Glacier,  northwest of Mount Howard in the Prince Albert Mountains of Victoria Land, Antarctica. It was first mapped by the British Antarctic Expedition, 1907–09, which named it for Ernest Joyce who was in charge of general stores, dogs, sledges, and zoological collections with the expedition and who had earlier been with the British National Antarctic Expedition, 1901–04. Joyce was also with the Ross Sea party of Shackleton's Imperial Trans-Antarctic Expedition, 1914–17.

Geology

Mount Joyce, along with nearby nunataks, such as the Trio Nunataks, represents the remnants of a tableland of the Jurassic Ferrar Group, which consists of Kirkpatrick lavas and Ferrar dolerite sills, alternating with rafts of sandstone of the Paleozoic and Mesozoic Beacon Supergroup. The strata dip about 1-2 degrees (at most) to the west. On Mount Joyce only three major dolerite sills are observed, with two thin interleaving seams of Beacon sediments.

References

Prince Albert Mountains
Mountains of Victoria Land
Scott Coast